Contai Subdivision is a subdivision of the Purba Medinipur district in the state of West Bengal, India.

Subdivisions
Purba Medinipur district is divided into the following administrative subdivisions:

Administrative units

Contai subdivision has 10 police stations, 8 community development blocks, 8 panchayat samitis, 61 gram panchayats, 1155 mouzas, 1129 inhabited villages, 1 municipality and 2 census towns. The municipality is: Contai. The census towns are: Khadalgobra and Basantia. The subdivision has its headquarters at Contai.

Area
Contai subdivision has an area of 1,251.21  km2, population in 2011 of 1,385,307 and density of population of 1,107 per km2. 27.18% of the population of the district resides in this subdivision.

Police stations
Police stations in Contai subdivision have the following features and jurisdiction:

 The data is as per the website of Purba Medinipur Police, but it appears that it has not been updated/ corrected for a long time

Blocks
Community development blocks in Contai subdivision are:

Gram panchayats
The subdivision contains 61 gram panchayats under 8 community development blocks:

 Contai I block: Badalpur, Mahisagot, Raipur–Paschimbarh, Dulalpur, Majilapur, Sabajput, Haipur and Nayaput.
 Deshapran block: Amtalia, Bamunia, Chalti, Dhobaberia, Aurai, Basantia, Dariyapur and Sarda.
 Contai III block: Bhajachauli, Durmuth, Kumirda, Lauda, Debendra, Kanaidighi, Kusumpur and Marishda.
 Bhagabanpur II block: Arjunnagar, Garbari–I, Jukhia, Baroj, Garbari–II, Mugberia, Basudevberia, Itaberia and Radhapur.
 Khejuri I block: Beerbandar, Kalagechia, Lakshmi, Henria, Kamarda and Tikashi.
 Khejuri II block: Bartala, Janka, Niz Kasba,  Haludbari and Khejuri.
 Ramnagar I block: Badhia, Haldia–I, Padima–II, Basantapur, Haldia–II, Talgachhari–I, Gobra, Padima–I and Talgachhari–II.
 Ramnagar II block: Badalpur, Depal, Kalindi, Paldui, Balisai, Kadua, Maithana and Satilapur.

Education
With a literacy rate of 87.66% Purba Medinipur district ranked first amongst all districts of West Bengal in literacy as per the provisional figures of the census of India 2011. Within Purba Medinipur district, Tamluk subdivision had a literacy rate of 85.98%, Haldia subdivision 86.67%, Egra subdivision 86.18% and Contai subdivision 89.19%. All CD Blocks and municipalities in the district had literacy levels above 80%.

Given in the table below (data in numbers) is a comprehensive picture of the education scenario in Purba Medinipur district for the year 2013-14. It may be noted that primary schools include junior basic schools; middle schools, high schools and higher secondary schools include madrasahs; technical schools include junior technical schools, junior government polytechnics, industrial technical institutes, industrial training centres, nursing training institutes etc.; technical and professional colleges include engineering colleges, polytechnics, medical colleges, para-medical institutes, management colleges, teachers training and nursing training colleges, law colleges, art colleges, music colleges etc. Special and non-formal education centres include sishu siksha kendras, madhyamik siksha kendras, centres of Rabindra mukta vidyalaya, recognised Sanskrit tols, institutions for the blind and other handicapped persons, Anganwadi centres, reformatory schools etc.

The following institutions are located in Contai subdivision:
Mugberia Gangadhar Mahavidyalaya at Mugberia, near Bhupatinagar in Bhagabanpur II CD Block was established in 1964. In addition to the courses in arts, science and commerce, it offers degree and post-graduate courses in physical education.
Ramnagar College at Depal in Ramnagar II CD Block was established in 1972. In addition to courses in arts, science and commerce, it offers courses in hospitality and tourism, and fishery and farm management.
Ramnagar B.Ed College at Depal in Ramnagar II CD Block offers B.Ed. course.   
Khejuri College at Baratala in Khejuri II CD Block was established in 1999. In addition to courses in arts, it offers a course in Aquaculture Management and Technology.
Prabhat Kumar College (also known as Kanthi College) at Contai was established in 1926. Apart from courses in arts, science and commerce, it offers B.Ed. and M.Sc. course in Physics.
Contai Polytechnic at Raghurampur PO Darua. 
Raghunath Ayurved Mahavidyalaya and Hospital, Contai.
Deshapran Mahavidyalaya at Durmut in Deshapran CD Block was established in 2010 and offers courses in arts.

Healthcare
The table below (all data in numbers) presents an overview of the medical facilities available and patients treated in the hospitals, health centres and sub-centres in 2014 in Purba Medinipur district.  
 

Medical facilities available in Contai subdivision are as follows:

Hospitals: (Name, location, beds) 
Contai Subdivision Hospital, Contai, 141 beds
Digha State General Hospital, Digha, 50 beds
Rural Hospitals: (Name, CD block, location, beds)
Basantia Rural Hospital, Deshapran CD block, Basantia, 30 beds
Bhupatinagar Mugberia Rural Hospital, Bhagabanpur II CD block, Bhupatinagar, 30 beds
Silaberia Rural Hospital, Khejuri II CD block, Silaberia, 30 beds
Bararankura Rural Hospital, Ramnagar II CD block, PO Balisai, 30 beds
Block Primary Health Centre: (Name, block, location, beds)
Majna BPHC, Contai I CD block, Majna, 15 beds
Kharipukuria BPHC, Contai III CD block, Kharipukuria, PO Nachinda Bazar, 10 beds
Kamarda BPHC, Khejuri I CD block, Kamarda Bazar, 15 beds
Digha Aghore Kamini BPHC, Ramnagar I CD block, Digha, 15 beds
Primary Health Centres: (CD block-wise)(CD block, PHC location, beds)
Contai I CD block: Kulberia (6), Nayaput (10)
Deshapran CD block: Barabantalia (15), Daulatpur, PO Dariapur (10)
Contai III CD block: Banamalichatta (10), Bhaitgarh (?), Deulbarh (2)
Bhagabanpur II CD block: Barberia (10), Simulia (6)
Khejuri I CD block: Heria (10)
Khejuri II CD block: Janka (10)
Ramnagar I CD block: Chandanpur (10), Gobra (6), Sadihat (6), Pichhaboni, PO Chowlkhola (10)
Ramnagar II CD block: Nijmaithula, PO Batatala (10), Hamirpur, PO Depal (2)

Electoral constituencies
Lok Sabha (parliamentary) and Vidhan Sabha (state assembly) constituencies in Purba Medinipur district were as follows:

External links

References

Subdivisions of West Bengal
Subdivisions in Purba Medinipur district
Purba Medinipur district